Denis Andrés Stracqualursi (born 20 October 1987) is an Argentine professional footballer who plays as a forward for Unión de Sunchales.

Career
Stracqualursi started his playing career in 2007 with Unión de Sunchales in the 3rd division of Argentine football. In 2008, he joined Gimnasia y Esgrima de La Plata, he scored his first goal for the club in a 1–0 win over Colón de Santa Fe.

On 3 February 2010 Stracqualursi scored 2 goals to help Gimnasia win the Clásico Platense 3–1, ending Estudiantes' run of five consecutive victories.

Stracqualursi joined Tigre for the 2010–11 Argentine Primera División season on a one-year loan with the option to buy. While Gimnasia struggled to find the net, scoring only 13 goals in total during the 2010 Apertura tournament Stracqualursi scored freely for Tigre. His 11th and last goal of the Apertura came in the postponed game with Independiente that was played on 6 February 2011. His tally of 11 goals made him the joint top scorer along with Santiago Silva of Vélez Sársfield, making him the first Tigre player ever to become top scorer in the Argentine Primera División.

Straqualursi continued his good goalscoring form in the Clausura tournament with nine goals in the first ten games including a hat-trick against Boca Juniors at the Bombonera on 17 April 2011 meaning that he had scored the same number of goals as the whole Gimnasia team combined at that stage of the tournament.

Everton
In August 2011, Stracqualursi signed a season-long loan deal with Premier League club Everton and was given squad number 11. Stracqualursi made his first appearance as a substitute in a home game against Wigan. He assisted in the third goal of a 3–1 victory. Stracqualursi made his first full start for Everton in a 2–1 League Cup home victory against West Brom. He had to wait until 4 January 2012, to make his first league start as he played the full game in a 2–1 defeat to Bolton Wanderers. Stracqualursi scored his first goal for Everton against Fulham in a 2–1 victory in the 4th round of the FA Cup. In the next game Stacqualursi received a standing ovation from the Goodison Park crowd after his key role in the 1–0 win over league leaders Manchester City. He scored his first Premier League goal in a 2–0 win against Chelsea at Goodison Park on 11 February. Stracqualursi continued his good run of scoring by netting his second goal in the FA Cup and third in five games against Blackpool in the fifth round. Despite only being at the club for one season, Stracqualursi became a cult hero amongst the Everton fans due to his hard work and commitment.

San Lorenzo
In July 2012, Stracqualursi moved on a free transfer from Tigre to fellow Argentine Primera División side San Lorenzo. His first goal was the winner in a 2–1 league victory over Colón in September. When the league began its two-month winter break in December, Stracqualursi had scored seven goals and made four assists in eighteen games to help San Lorenzo to 11th in the league. In April, Stracqualursi was sent off in the 38th minute of a league match against Godoy Cruz with the score at 0–0. The match went on to finish 1–1.

Emelec
In July 2013, Stracqualursi signed for Ecuadorian Serie A side Club Sport Emelec. He scored two goals on his debut in a league game against Barcelona Sporting Club.

Lanús
In July 2015, Stracqualursi signed for Argentine Primera División side Lanús.

After a spell playing in Italy's Serie D, Stracqualursi returned to Argentina to join Torneo Argentino A side Unión de Sunchales.

Club career statistics

Achievements

Individual
Primera División top scorer: 1
 2010 Apertura (shared with Santiago Silva)

References

External links
ESPN statistics 
Denis Stracqualursi – Argentine Primera statistics at Fútbol XXI 
 

1987 births
Living people
People from Rafaela
Argentine footballers
Argentine expatriate footballers
Association football forwards
Club de Gimnasia y Esgrima La Plata footballers
Club Atlético Tigre footballers
San Lorenzo de Almagro footballers
C.S. Emelec footballers
Everton F.C. players
Baniyas Club players
Club Atlético Lanús footballers
Independiente Santa Fe footballers
Aldosivi footballers
Atlético de Rafaela footballers
Argentine Primera División players
Premier League players
Ecuadorian Serie A players
UAE Pro League players
Categoría Primera A players
Expatriate footballers in England
Expatriate footballers in Ecuador
Expatriate footballers in the United Arab Emirates
Expatriate footballers in Colombia
Argentine expatriate sportspeople in England
Argentine expatriate sportspeople in Ecuador
Argentine expatriate sportspeople in the United Arab Emirates
Argentine expatriate sportspeople in Colombia
U.S.D. Città di Fasano players
Taranto F.C. 1927 players
Serie D players
Expatriate footballers in Italy
Argentine expatriate sportspeople in Italy
Sportspeople from Santa Fe Province